Alfredo Pedraza Arias (born 20 December 2000) is a Spanish professional footballer who plays as a central defender for UD San Sebastián de los Reyes.

Club career
Pedraza was born in Madrid, and was an Atlético Madrid youth graduate. On 7 August 2019, after finishing his formation, he was loaned to Segunda División B side CF La Nucía for the season.

Pedraza made his senior debut on 25 August 2019, starting in a 1–0 home win against UE Cornellà. He scored his first goal on 29 September, netting the winner in a 2–1 home success over UE Olot.

On 1 July 2020, Pedraza signed a two-year contract with Levante UD, being assigned to the reserves also in the third division. He made his first team debut the following 6 January, starting in a 2–1 away win against Club Portugalete, for the season's Copa del Rey.

On 1 February 2021, Pedraza joined Segunda División side SD Ponferradina. He made his professional debut on 18 May, coming on as a second-half substitute for Iván Rodríguez in a 1–4 home loss against RCD Espanyol.

On 27 August 2021, Pedraza moved to UD San Sebastián de los Reyes in Primera División RFEF.

References

External links

2000 births
Living people
Footballers from Madrid
Spanish footballers
Association football defenders
Segunda División players
Segunda División B players
Atlético Madrid B players
CF La Nucía players
Atlético Levante UD players
Levante UD footballers
SD Ponferradina players
UD San Sebastián de los Reyes players